Francis Gordon Atherton , born 18 June 1934 in Horwich in Lancashire,  was  an English footballer who played as a right half in the Football League.

Atherton played for Bury, Swindon Town and Drumcondra.

Generally known by his second name Gordon.

Signed professional forms with Bury in 1956 and has been a regular first-team choice ever since gaining his place in that initial season. Was an ever-present when Bury won promotion
to Div 2 in 1960–1961.

An attacking wing-half who gets through a tremendous amount of work.

Atherton played for Swindon Town from 1964 to 1965, then back to Bury from 1965 to 1966.

Then played for Drumcondra in Dublin from 1966 to 1967.

References

External links

1934 births
Living people
English footballers
People from Horwich
Bury F.C. players
Swindon Town F.C. players
English Football League players
Drumcondra F.C. players
Association football wing halves